The Sarbloh Granth or Sarabloh Granth (literally 'Scripture of Pure Iron'), also called Manglacharan Puran or Sri Manglacharan Ji, is a voluminous scripture, composed of more than 6,500 poetic stanzas.

The Sarabloh Granth is a separate religious text from the Guru Granth Sahib and Dasam Granth, and no hymn or composition of this granth is used in daily Sikh liturgy or Amrit Sanchar. Khalsa Mahima is present in this granth.

There is only one complete commentary and exegesis of this granth available, as it is still in research.

Authorship
There is high controversy among various scholars on authorship of the Granth. Following are some of points:
 According to Pundit Tara Singh, Sarabloh Granth was composed by Bhai Sukha Singh, a Granthi of Patna.
 According to Bhai Kahn Singh Nabha, Sarabloh Granth was not written by Guru Gobind Singh and Khalsa Mahima appeared in it is out of context to the main storyline.
 According to Santa Singh Nihang, Sarabloh Granth was written by Guru Gobind Singh and was completed in Nanded.
 A meeting of Sikh scholars and saints determined that Sarbloh Granth is the writings of Guru Gobind Singh and that the Sarbloh Granth was finalised at Nanded.

Contents
Sarbloh Granth is separated into 5 chapters known as adhiyas.

See also 
 Guru Granth Sahib
 Dasam Granth
 Sikhism
 Sikh gurus

References

Sikh scripture
Sikh terminology